Dr. William Russell MacAusland (December 9, 1922 – January 15, 2004) was the Surgeon in Chief Orthopedic Department at the Carney Hospital in Boston. He held the distinction of performing the first plastic hip operation in the United States in 1950.

References
W. R. MacAusland's obituary

Further reading 
 Brand, Richard A, M.D., "Biographical Sketch: William Russell MacAusland, MD 1882–1965", Clin Orthop Relat Res. Jan 2011; 469(1): 3–4.

American orthopedic surgeons
1922 births
2004 deaths
20th-century surgeons